Cristina Pereira (8 March 1968 – 30 October 2009) was a Portuguese beach volleyball player. She competed in the women's tournament at the 2000 Summer Olympics.

References

External links
 

1968 births
2009 deaths
Portuguese women's beach volleyball players
Olympic beach volleyball players of Portugal
Beach volleyball players at the 2000 Summer Olympics
Place of birth missing